The Harrow & the Harvest is the fifth studio album by American singer-songwriter Gillian Welch. It was Welch's first album in eight years and was released on June 28, 2011. The album was nominated for Best Folk Album for the 54th Grammy Awards.

Background
The eight years since the release of 2003's Soul Journey marked the longest period of time between album releases for Welch. In explaining the relatively long recording absence, Welch said, "The sad truth is we never liked anything enough to put it out, which is not a pleasant place to be."  She added, "over the course of that time that we were quiet we probably had enough songs to put out two or three records. Actually we made a few tentative steps at trying to record, but inevitably the heart would go out of it when we realised that we simply didn't like the material enough to go on with it."  Welch frequently performed the song "The Way It Will Be" in years prior to the release of the album. Welch explains that this tense time period inspired the album title: "Our songcraft slipped and I really don't know why. It's not uncommon. It's something that happens to writers. It's the deepest frustration we have come through, hence the album title." The writing process involved "this endless back and forth between the two of us," Welch said, stating that "It’s our most intertwined, co-authored, jointly-composed album." John Dyer Baizley provided artwork for the album.

Recording
According to Welch, "The songs are mostly first and second takes, and Dave composed some of the music spontaneously in the studio. It was very freeing. We learned to accept mistakes and rough edges, because those didn't impede what the heart of the matter was."

Reception

The Harrow & the Harvest was met with "universal acclaim" reviews from critics. At Metacritic, which assigns a weighted average rating out of 100 to reviews from mainstream publications, this release received an average score of 85 based on 28 reviews. Aggregate website AnyDecentMusic? gave the release an 8.5 out of 10 based on a critical consensus of 27 reviews.

Uncut placed it at 2 on their "Top 50 albums of 2011" list, while Q, Mojo, and Paste placed it at number 28, 34, and 39, respectively.

Track listing

Charts

Weekly charts

Year-end charts

References

2011 albums
Gillian Welch albums
Albums with cover art by John Dyer Baizley